Utpal Datta is an Assamese film critic from Guwahati.

Career
Utpal Datta earned his Masters in Arts from Gauhati University.He later joined the All India Radio Guwahati, where his book 24 Frames (2008), an anthology of articles on Indian cinema, was released as a radio program.

Awards and recognition
 Special Jury Mention for in Cinema at the National Film Awards

References

External links
 https://twitter.com/airnews_ghy/status/1634239304095633409/photo/1
 http://passionforcinema.com/radio-premier-of-24-frames/
 http://www.utpaldatta.com
https://epaper.prabhatkhabar.com/2881161/Hazaribagh-Chatra/Hazaribagh#page/4/1
 http://roopkar.wordpress.com/
 http://www.ugc.ac.in/pdfnews/5918997_B.A.-with-Assamese.pdf
 https://cinematicillusions.com/film-reviews/benegals-new-cinema/
 https://cinematicillusions.com/film-reviews/onaatah/
 https://cinematicillusions.com/film-reviews/the-pangti-story/
 http://www.aajnews.in/wp-content/uploads/2019/10/page-7-copy-6.jpg
 https://m.youtube.com/watch?feature=share&v=Vss7Snp5c5k
 http://www.assamtribune.com/scripts/spda.asp?id=2019/sep0419/BigPage21.jpg
 https://www.amazon.in/Chalachitrar-Rakhachadan-
%E0%A6%9A%E0%A6%B2%E0%A6%9A%E0%A6%BF%E0%A7%8D%E0%A6%9A%E0%A6%A4%E0%A7%8D%E0%A7%B0-%E0%A7%B0%E0%A6%B8%E0%A6%BE%E0%A6%B8%E0%A7%8D%E0%A6%AC%E0%A6%BE%E0%A6%A6%E0%A6%A8-Utpal/dp/B084GNXBT8/ref=sr_1_17?crid=18Y3TOYWMC35R&keywords=purbayon+publication&qid=1583435996&s=books&sprefix=purbay%2Caps%2C402&sr=1-17
 https://thestorymug.com/utpal-datta-in-love-of-films-and-filmmaking/

Indian film critics
Indian radio presenters
Writers from Guwahati
Living people
Year of birth missing (living people)
Gauhati University alumni